Lodewijk Sigismund Vincent Gustaaf Reichsgraf van Heiden (transliterated Russian name: Loggin Petrovich Geyden; 6 September 1773 – 17 October 1850) was a Dutch admiral who commanded a squadron of the Imperial Russian Navy in the Battle of Navarino (1827).

Personal life
Born in Zuidlaren, in the north east of the Netherlands, Van Heiden was the second son of Sigismund Pieter Alexander Reichsgraf van Heiden, Lord of Reinestein and Laarwoud, Drost of Drenthe, and Marie Frederique Freiin van Reede. He is the only Dutch naval hero to have come from the landlocked province of Drenthe.

Van Heiden married Anne-Marie Akeleye, daughter of Captain Johannes Akeleye, a Danish-born sea officer in Russian service. They had four children, including their sons Friedrich Moritz and Ludwig Heinrich Sigismund van Heiden, the future Governor-General of the Grand Duchy of Finland.

Early naval career
Lodewijk van Heiden joined the Dutch Navy at the age of nine, and was promoted to Lieutenant-at-sea at sixteen. He made several journeys to the Dutch overseas territories during his six years in active duty. He remained a faithful Orangeist and accompanied Stadtholder William V on his flight from Scheveningen to England. Upon his return to the Netherlands he was captured and locked up in the ill-reputed Gevangenpoort prison in The Hague. Despite being questioned harshly several times he always refused to give any details on William's passage. He was set free after two months on the initiative of the French general Pichegru. He then resigned his commission and returned to Zuidlaren.

In 1795, Van Heiden, or Geiden, as he became known in Russia, offered his services to the Russian Emperor. He was appointed Captain-Lieutenant at sea at only twenty-two, and quickly rose through the ranks. He operated in the Black Sea until 1803; during that period, he was promoted to Captain at sea 2nd class. After marrying van Heiden settled in Estonia, then one of the Russian Baltic provinces.

In 1808, Van Heiden was promoted to Captain 1st class and was awarded command of the Russian flotilla in Viborg in the 1808-09 war against Sweden following Russia's alliance with Napoleon after the treaty at Tilsit in 1807. He defeated a Swedish galley fleet in the Battle of Sandöström  together with Lieutenant-Commander Pyotr Dodt. The Swedish flotilla retreated to Åland whereas the Swedish and British high sea fleets continued to control the Baltic Sea. Afterwards, van Heiden was made Squadron commander in the Grand Duchy of Finland.

After the siege of Danzig (1813), Van Heiden was promoted to Commodore. He was decorated several times during this period, apparently partly in order to keep him in the Russian ranks.

Commander in the Mediterranean

In 1826, Van Heiden was given command of the Russian fleet in the Mediterranean (with Mikhail Lazarev as deputy). On 27 October 1827 he was the commander of the Russian squadron in the Battle of Navarino against the Turks during the Greek War of Independence - one of the most important sea battles of that war. It ended with the defeat of the Turko-Egyptian fleet and the destruction of the feared artillery at the fortress of Navarino. Van Heiden narrowly escaped death when the quarter-deck where he was standing was shattered by a cannonball. The victory meant promotion to Vice-Admiral and several more decorations. His international prestige grew: the Greeks considered him their redeemer from the Turks. In Athens one of the roads to Victoria Square is named after van Heiden. There is also a statue, and in 1927 his portrait was on a Greek stamp.

Governor of Kronstadt

At the height of his fame, respected everywhere and by everyone, decorated with numerous European medals, he was summoned by the Tsar to become military governor of Kronstadt (on Kotlin Island in the Gulf of Finland between Estonia and Saint Petersburg) and Reval (Tallinn, now capital of Estonia, then capital of the Governorate of Estonia). The population loved him and, as the Greeks did, called him baba (Father).

Return to the Netherlands
In 1832, Van Heiden returned to the Netherlands for the last time. He was welcomed by the monarch, King William I, who lent him an armoured steamship to visit several important cities, as well as his home town, Zuidlaren. Guards of honour accompanied him to the town hall and a large banquet was held at Laarwoud. He stayed at the estate for some time, but couldn't reacclimatise and shrank into himself. He only appeared in public to sail the Zuidlaardermeer lake. He left for the New World, but was disappointed and eventually returned to Estonia. Back in Tallinn he fell ill from edema and died there in 1850 at the age of 77. Contrary to his wish to be buried in Zuidlaren, Van Heiden was buried at the now destroyed Kopli cemetery in Tallinn.

Honours and awards
 Order of St. Alexander Nevsky with diamonds
 Order of St. George, III degree (9 November 1827), IV degree (6 June 1821)
 Order of Saint Vladimir. 1st class
 Order of the White Eagle
 Honorary Knight Commander of the Order of the Bath
 Commander of the Military Order of William (26 August 1832)
 Order of St. Anna 1st class
 Knight Grand Cross of the Royal Order of Francis I
 Grand Cross of the Order of the Redeemer (Greece) 
 Commander Grand Cross of the Order of the Sword (Sweden)
 Gold Sword for Bravery

References

External links

N. Michalkova (1996) Словарь русских генералов, участников боевых действий против армии Наполеона Бонапарта в 1812-1815 гг, volume VII, pp. 353–354, 1996, Russian Archives 
Lodewijk Sigismund Vincent van Heiden, Rijksbureau voor Kunsthistorische Documentatie 
Heiden, (Lodewijk Sigismund Vincent Gustaaf graaf van) , Nieuw Nederlandsch Biografisch Woordenboek (NNBW) volume 5, p. 224 

1773 births
1850 deaths
18th-century Dutch people
19th-century Dutch people
Dutch admirals in Russian service
Imperial Russian Navy admirals
Dutch sailors
People from Zuidlaren
Dutch nobility
Deaths from edema
Russian people of the Greek War of Independence
Dutch people of the Napoleonic Wars
Russian commanders of the Napoleonic Wars
Recipients of the Order of the White Eagle (Russia)
Recipients of the Order of St. Vladimir, 1st class
Recipients of the Order of St. George of the Third Degree
Knights Commander of the Military Order of William
Honorary Knights Commander of the Order of the Bath
Recipients of the Order of St. Anna, 1st class
Commanders Grand Cross of the Order of the Sword
Recipients of the Gold Sword for Bravery
Burials in Estonia